Shoma Chaudhury is an Indian journalist, editor, and political commentator. She was managing editor and one of the founders of Tehelka, an investigative public interest newsmagazine. She also co-founded and was director of THiNK, an international conference of ideas, and Algebra, the Arts & Ideas Club, a platform for live conversations with prominent Indians. Chaudhury is the founder of Lucid Lines Productions, an intellectual properties company.

Biography
Chaudhury was born in Darjeeling, and grew up in the tea gardens of Dooars where both her parents were doctors. She studied in St Helen’s Convent in Kurseong; La Martiniere School in Kolkata; and in Lady Shri Ram College, New Delhi. She topped Delhi University twice, in both BA and MA English..

Awards
In 2011, Newsweek (USA) picked Shoma Chaudhury as one of "150 power women who shake the world". The other Indian women on the list that year were Sonia Gandhi and Arundhati Roy. She has also been awarded the Sabbiadoro Ernest Hemingway Award for Political Journalism (2013), the Mumbai Press Club award for political journalism (2012), the Ramnath Goenka award and  the Chameli Devi Jain Award for Outstanding Women Mediaperson (2009) for "going where angels fear to tread". She was honoured by her alma mater Lady Shri Ram College, Delhi, with the alumni of the year award in 2013. In 2018, she was invited to deliver the Gandhi Oration in Sydney, the first Indian to do so.

Apart from her career in print and digital journalism, Shoma is a virtuoso speaker, both on television and stage, and has been invited to address many forums both in India and abroad, including America, Britain, Edinburgh, Italy, France, Spain, Australia, Morocco, Singapore and Indonesia. She has also interviewed the most cutting edge minds globally on politics, policy, economy, business, science, civil society, cinema, literature, sports and media.

Shoma has also curated and hosted several large conferences at the Royal Society of Arts in London and Asia Society, as well as guest curated conferences for the YPO, EO, and the prestigious India Today group.

Body of work
Chaudhury has reported extensively on issues of justice, social equity, human rights, environment, the media, law, and the fight over resources. She built a reputation for in-depth ground reportage, incisive commentary, portraits and interviews across disciplines. Several of her stories, in defence of human rights workers and others falsely accused by the State, were instrumental in getting people out of jail. Her counter-narrative stories on Dr Binayak Sen, the Aarushi Talwar-Hemraj murder, tribal teacher Soni Sori’s imprisonment and others won many accolades.

Algebra conversations 

Algebra – the Arts and Ideas Club was started by Chaudhury in September 2016. Since then, it has hosted myriad conversations presenting mainstream public figures in new light or highlighting counter-narratives. This includes grassroot social transformers, dispossessed voices whoa are often ignored by the mainstream media, including sewage workers, farmers, tribals, environmental activists and Muslims falsely accused of terror.

Controversies

In 2013, Shoma resigned from Tehelka following a controversy surrounding her handling of a sexual assault complaint by a colleague against Tehelka editor and founder, Tarun Tejpal. Chaudhury, who is a prominent voice on women issues, was criticised by the media and some colleagues for possibly underplaying the case at her own magazine.

References

External links 
 Algebra – the Arts and Ideas Club

Journalists from West Bengal
Indian literary critics
Living people
Indian women journalists
Lady Shri Ram College alumni
La Martiniere Calcutta alumni
Indian women critics
Women writers from West Bengal
Indian political journalists
21st-century Indian women writers
21st-century Indian writers
21st-century Indian journalists
1971 births